Clitaetra is a genus of spiders in a family Araneidae. It was formerly placed in a separate family, Nephilidae. It occurs in Africa, Madagascar and Sri Lanka, hinting to a Gondwanan origin. a split between Clitaetra and related genera may be as old as 160 million years.

The smallest species (C. thisbe) reaches 3.5 mm in female length, a biggest species can be as long as one centimetre.

Name
The etymology of the genus name is unknown.

Species
, a World Spider Catalog accepted a following species:
 Clitaetra clathrata Simon, 1907 – West Africa
 Clitaetra episinoides Simon, 1889  – Comoro Is.
 Clitaetra irenae Kuntner, 2006 – South Africa
 Clitaetra perroti Simon, 1894 – Madagascar
 Clitaetra simoni Benoit, 1962 – Congo
 Clitaetra thisbe Simon, 1903 – Sri Lanka

References

Araneidae
Spiders of Africa
Spiders of Asia
Araneomorphae genera